Henry Stewart, D.D. was an Anglican priest in Ireland in the nineteenth century.

Stewart was born in Dublin and educated at Trinity College, Dublin. He was ordained in 1861. After two curacies he became Rector  of Kilmore, County Down in 1866. From 1870 he was the incumbent at Seapatrick; and from 1879 Archdeacon of Dromore.

Notes

1836 births
1886 deaths
Alumni of Trinity College Dublin
Archdeacons of Dromore
19th-century Irish Anglican priests